Petricolaria dactylus, common name petricola, is a species of saltwater clam, a marine bivalve mollusk in the family Veneridae, the Venus clams.

Habitat and distribution
Petricolaria dactylus is a perforating species of substrates such as sandstone and stony bottoms. This species is native to the eastern coast of South America from Uruguay to the Patagonian Atlantic coast.

References 

Veneridae
Bivalves described in 1823